David Burns may refer to:

Sports
David Burns (basketball) (born 1958), American basketball player
David Burns (footballer, born 1934) (1934–2010), Scottish football player (Kilmarnock FC, St. Johnstone)
David Burns (footballer, born 1958), English football player (Chester City)
Dave Burns (football manager), Dutch-British football coach
Dave Burns (sportscaster) (born 1963), American sportscaster

Others
David Burns (actor) (1902–1971), American actor
David Burns (radio presenter) (born 1959), British radio presenter focusing on sports
David Burns, Lord Burns, Scottish judge
David C. Burns, American politician from Maine
David D. Burns (born 1942), American psychotherapist and author
David R. Burns, American politician from Maine
Dave Burns (musician) (1924–2009), American jazz trumpeter
Dave Burns, a character from the British television series Brookside

See also
David Burn (1799–1875), Tasmanian dramatist
David Byrne (disambiguation)